Alan Miguel Zamora González (born 8 April 1985) is a Mexican former professional footballer. He played as a midfielder for Veracruz on loan from Querétaro of the Liga MX. He made his debut March 3, 2007, against Necaxa, which resulted in a 3–0 victory for Atlante.

Honours
Atlante
Primera División: Apertura 2007

External links
 
 
 
 

1985 births
Living people
Liga MX players
Atlante F.C. footballers
Footballers from Mexico City
Mexican footballers
Chiapas F.C. footballers
Club Puebla players
San Luis F.C. players
C.D. Veracruz footballers
Association football midfielders